In algebraic geometry, a Mori Dream Space is a projective variety whose cone of effective divisors has a well-behaved decomposition into certain convex sets called "Mori chambers".  showed that Mori dream spaces are quotients of affine varieties by torus actions. The notion is named so because it behaves nicely from the point of view of Mori's minimal model program.

See also 
spherical variety

References

Algebraic geometry